The PeopleMover, sometimes referred to as the Goodyear PeopleMover and WEDWay PeopleMover, was a transport attraction that opened on July 2, 1967, in Tomorrowland at Disneyland Resort in Anaheim, California. Guests boarded small trains that ran on elevated tracks for a "grand circle tour" above Tomorrowland. The term "people mover," now in wider use to describe many forms of automated public transport, was first coined as the name for this attraction. PeopleMover was originally only a working title, but became attached to the project over time. The attraction was initially seen as a serious prototype for intercity public transport. A second PeopleMover opened on July 1, 1975 in Tomorrowland at the Magic Kingdom in Walt Disney World Resort in Bay Lake, Florida near Orlando, Florida, and is still operating today.

Operation

The attraction's vehicles were always moving. Passengers boarded and alighted by a large speed-matched rotating platform inside the station. The trains were not powered by motors within themselves. Rather, they were pushed by rotating tires embedded in the track once every nine feet, each of which had its own electric motor.

Each car included its own sound system which broadcast a continuous audio commentary and soundtrack, relative to the train's location. The commentary pointed out Disneyland's attractions along the way as well as announcing promotional items.

The tour continued from the center of Tomorrowland through a few of Tomorrowland's buildings, for a look inside, and over Disneyland's Submarine Lagoon and Autopia areas, before returning to Tomorrowland.

The attraction's onboard soundtrack originally consisted of the Goodyear jingle "Go, Go, Goodyear" and George Bruns' instrumentals "Nation on Wheels" and "The Monorail Song". From 1976 until its closure, the attraction's onboard soundtrack consisted of instrumental pieces composed by Danish composer Ole Georg for Capitol Records' production music library, Capitol Media Music.

Sponsorship
The attraction used an updated WEDway system based on the WEDway used for the Ford Magic Skyway at the 1964–65 New York World's Fair. When Disney asked Ford Motor Company to continue sponsorship by sponsoring Disneyland's new PeopleMover, they declined, because Ford was reluctant to support technology that appeared to replace the automobile. Goodyear was then approached to sponsor it, and accepted. The wheels used in the WEDway system were replaced by Goodyear's tires. The PeopleMover's logo was then fashioned after Goodyear's logo, sharing a similar typeface. Goodyear sponsored the PeopleMover from its opening until December 31, 1981. However, Goodyear's instrumental "Go Go Goodyear" advertising jingle still served as part of the attraction's soundtrack until at least 1990.

History
The PeopleMover opened as part of New Tomorrowland in 1967. Originally, each four-car train was colored either red, blue, yellow or green with white roofs. They were repainted all white with colored stripes in 1987-88, similar to the new Mark V Monorails that began operation around the same time. In 1968, each of the 62 trains were retrofitted with safety rails for each car, to deter guests from climbing out.  In 1985, these safety rails were modified to completely wrap around each car, making it even more difficult for possible accidents to occur.

SuperSpeed Tunnel
In 1977, the SuperSpeed Tunnel was added to the PeopleMover. It was located in the upper level of the Carousel Building, which then housed America Sings. Race cars were projected on the walls of the tunnel all around the trains. In 1982, the projections were changed to scenes from the film Tron and the tunnel was announced as the Game Grid of Tron by the on-board audio guide. After this addition, the attraction was advertised as the PeopleMover Thru the World of Tron.

Deaths and incidents

In August 1967, a 16-year-old boy from Hawthorne, California, was killed while jumping between two moving PeopleMover cars as the ride was passing through a tunnel. He stumbled and fell onto the track, where an oncoming train of cars crushed him beneath its wheels and dragged his body a few hundred feet before it was stopped by a ride operator. The attraction had only been open for one month at the time.

In 1972, four teenage girls were riding the PeopleMover when one teenager lost her mouse ears cap. She and her cousin jumped onto the track to retrieve them. Realizing they'd have to get on a different PeopleMover car, the first girl successfully got into a car, while the second girl ran through a tunnel and out the exit and then fell into a guard rail and onto the concrete 30 feet below. She broke an arm, hip, and pelvis; she had to be in a body brace and have a pin inserted into her leg. She sued Disney for not having any warnings about the exit.

On June 7, 1980, an 18-year-old man was crushed and killed by the PeopleMover while jumping between moving cars. The accident occurred as the ride entered the SuperSpeed tunnel.

Closure
The PeopleMover closed on August 21, 1995 since Imagineers thought the ride was past its time and no longer a prototype, but rather a place to rest one's feet and also as part of Michael Eisner and Paul Pressler's program to save money by shutting down expensive and classic attractions. When Toy Story Funhouse operated as a temporary attraction during the 1996 season, a few character statues from the film sat on the PeopleMover track. It was replaced by the short-lived Rocket Rods in 1998. Due to the failure of Euro Disney, officials kept the PeopleMover track unbanked and original.

A few of the retired PeopleMover cars were used in other parts of the resort after its closing. Three cars from train #45 used to sit outside the Team Disney Anaheim building, but they were removed in 2007. One of the cars from train #45 is now in display at the cast members cafe called the Eat Ticket. Another car from train #45 is now owned by a local resident. Two cars were repainted with a blue and orange grid to resemble a blueprint (along with Rocket Jets vehicles and the front of a Mark III Disneyland-ALWEG monorail train) and placed in the queue display for Rocket Rods, which would later close in 2000. These were later sold on Disney Auctions after Rocket Rods closed.

The checkout counters at the Little Green Men Store Command in Tomorrowland resemble PeopleMover cars and the store has former Rocket Jets vehicles retrofitted as merchandise shelves. The store also had Skyway buckets hanging from the ceiling when it was the Premiere Shop.

In 2000, almost five years after the attraction's closure, an updated version of the Autopia attraction opened. The old on-board audio music from the PeopleMover served as the background area music in Autopia's queue from 2000 to 2017.

The ride track infrastructure which served both the PeopleMover and Rocket Rods still stands unused in Tomorrowland. The track, however, is still being maintained, as it was repainted in 2005 along with the rest of Tomorrowland, and foliage over the Autopia area was trimmed away or removed from the track. In September 2010 at D23's "Destination D" event, then-president of Disneyland Resort George Kalogridis said that while there may be plans to bring back the ride, the park would not be able to return the attraction to its original form due to stricter regulations. Kalogridis stated "Everyone understands the passion everyone has for it." He additionally stated, "Hang in there."

Portions of the track can still be viewed from the monorail and the Astro Orbiter ride.

Popular culture references
A homage to the PeopleMover appears in the 2008 Disney·Pixar film WALL-E, depicting a transportation system with the name "PEOPLEMOVER" and the ride's signature circular boarding station.
The box and poster art for Mega64's Version 3 DVD parodies the poster designs of the PeopleMover and Matterhorn Bobsleds, as well as Walt Disney's Disneyland opening day speech.
In the 2010 video game Disney Epic Mickey, the PeopleMover is featured in Tomorrow City, a dystopian version of Tomorrowland.

See also

List of former Disneyland attractions
Omnimover, a ride system named after the PeopleMover, developed by Bob Gurr and used in later Disney attractions
Rail transport in Walt Disney Parks and Resorts
Subway (George Bush Intercontinental Airport), a people mover at George Bush Intercontinental Airport, built by WED Enterprises

References

External links

Peoplemover on Yesterland.com

1967 establishments in California
1995 disestablishments in California
Amusement rides introduced in 1967
Amusement rides that closed in 1995
Disneyland
Former Walt Disney Parks and Resorts attractions
Goodyear Tire and Rubber Company
Former people mover systems in the United States
Rail transport in Walt Disney Parks and Resorts
Railroads of amusement parks in the United States
Tomorrowland
WEDway people movers